The 2007 Carlisle City Council election took place on 3 May 2007 to elect members of Carlisle District Council in Cumbria, England. One third of the council was up for election and the council stayed under no overall control.

After the election, the composition of the council was:
Labour 25
Conservative 19
Liberal Democrats 7
Independent 1

Background
Before the election the Conservative party formed the administration on the council with the support of the Liberal Democrats, but Labour were the largest party with 24 seats, compared to 19 Conservatives, 7 Liberal Democrats and 1 independent. A further seat was vacant in Morton, after the Liberal Democrat councillor Ralph Aldersey stood down from the council.

18 seats were being contested with Labour needing to make at least 2 gains to take control of the council. Candidates at the election included an independent Maureen Toole in Belah ward, after her husband Alan Toole, the sitting councillor for the ward, was deselected by the Conservatives. Both the Conservative and Labour parties contested all 18 seats, while the Liberal Democrats had candidates in 6 wards. The British National Party contested seats in Carlisle for the first time, with 6 candidates, and there was also 1 candidate from the English Democrats.

Campaign
Labour campaigned on a pledge to tackle anti-social behaviour, such as dog fouling and littering, and targeted Morton from the Liberal Democrats and Belah from the Conservatives, where they were hoping the Conservative vote would be split due to the independent candidate. Meanwhile, the Conservatives defended their record in control of the council and targeted the Labour held seats of Belle Vue and Yewdale. The Liberal Democrats defended their seats, while hoping to gain Dalston from the Conservatives and Upperby from Labour.

During the campaign the national Conservative leader David Cameron visited Carlisle to support his party in the election, while the Constitutional Affairs Minister Harriet Harman came to support Labour.

Election result
Only 1 seat changed hands at the election, with Labour gaining Morton from the Liberal Democrats to remain the largest party on the council with 25 seats. Labour also narrowly beat off Conservative challenges in Belle Vue by 31 votes and in Yewdale by only 10 votes. This meant the Conservatives stayed on 19 councillors, the Liberal Democrats dropped to 7, and there continued to be 1 independent. Among those elected was Labour's Abdul Harid in Currock ward, who became the first Asian councillor on Carlisle council, defeating the British National Party who came second in the ward. Overall turnout at the election was 35.45%, up from 34.6% at the 2006 election.

Following the election Conservative Mike Mitchelson remained as leader of the council after the Liberal Democrats continued to support him, in return for which Liberal Democrat Peter Farmer joined the council executive. The election for mayor was won by Conservative Liz Mallinson by 26 votes to 25 for Labour's Mary Styth, after one Labour councillor missed the meeting, while Mike Mitchelson was re-elected by 26 votes to 24. All 7 Liberal Democrats backed the Conservative candidates, while the only independent councillor Bill Graham, voted for the Labour candidate for mayor Mary Styth, as she had served on the council for the longest period, and abstained on the vote for council leader.

Ward results

References

2007 English local elections
2007
2000s in Cumbria